Astoria Financial Corporation was a bank holding company based in Lake Success, New York. On October 2, 2017, the company was acquired by Sterling Bancorp.

As of December 31, 2016, the company's principal subsidiary, Astoria Bank, operated 88 locations.

History
In 1888, the bank was first chartered by New York State.

In 1936, the name was changed to Astoria Savings & Loan Association.

In 1937, the bank received a federal charter and became Astoria Federal Savings & Loan Association.

In 1989, George L. Engelke, Jr., was named president and chief executive officer of the company.

In 1993, Astoria Financial Corporation was created as part of the conversion from a mutual organization to a joint-stock company.

In 1995, the bank acquired Fidelity New York Savings Bank for $160 million in cash.

In 1997, the bank acquired Greater New York Savings Bank for $293 million in stock and cash.

In 1998, the bank acquired Long Island Savings Bank for $1.8 billion.

In 2012, George L. Engelke, Jr. resigned as chairman.

In 2017, the bank was acquired by Sterling Bancorp.

References

Banks established in 1888
Banks disestablished in 2017
Defunct financial services companies of the United States
Defunct banks of the United States
1888 establishments in the United States
2017 disestablishments in the United States